Craig Williams is an American politician serving as a member of the Iowa Senate from the 6th district. Elected in November 2020, he assumed office on January 11, 2021.

Early life and education 
Williams is a native of Rockford, Illinois. He earned a Bachelor of Science degree in operations management and information systems from Bradley University in 1984. Williams learned assembly language as a college student.

Career

Business 
After graduating from college, Williams moved to Chicago and became a software developer for Arthur Andersen. After marrying his wife in 1985, Williams left Chicago and worked as a software developer for Thermos LLC. He later moved with his wife and two children to Manning, Iowa, where he worked in the IT department of Garst Seed Company. He also worked as an accountant for the company before joining Midwest Seed Genetics in 1998. In 2001, he became the director of operations for Channel Bio LLC. In 2004, he joined Stauffer Seed Company and later managed the sale of Renze Seed Company to Dow AgroSciences. Williams later left the seed industry and founded an independent consulting business.

Politics 
In 2008, Williams was elected chair of the Carroll County Republican Central Committee. He later served as treasurer of the Republican Party of Iowa. Williams was elected to the Iowa Senate in November 2020 and assumed office on January 11, 2021. He serves as vice chair of the Senate Government Oversight Committee.

References 

Living people
People from Rockford, Illinois
Bradley University alumni
People from Carroll County, Iowa
Republican Party Iowa state senators
Year of birth missing (living people)